Howard Van Pelt (September 27, 1830April 20, 1878) was a 19th-century New York Sandy Hook Pilot. He is best known for being a Sandy Hook pilot that lost his life on duty. He was knocked overboard when the hawser parted struck him in the chest while towing the bark Ukraine. His son, James Howard Van Pelt, was also a Sandy Hook pilot and lost his life when boarding a tank ship in 1915.

Early life and career 

Howard Van Pelt was born on September 27, 1830, in Stapleton, Staten Island. His father was Jacob Van Pelt and his mother was Mary Simonson. He married Margaret M. Perry and had five children.

He was a pilot who trained his son, James Howard Van Pelt, in the piloting business who became a Sandy Hook pilot. His son was fifteen when he helped his father sail a four masted schooner safely into the Brooklyn docks.

On May 21, 1866, Howard Van Pelt was listed as a member on the Board of Pilot Commissioners.

Death 

On April 20, 1878, Howard Van Pelt, at age 47, drowned when he was knocked overboard when towing the bark Ukraine off Sandy Hook. The hawser parted striking him in the chest killing him instantly. His body was recovered and taken to his residence at Stapleton, Staten Island. He was buried at the Silver Mount Cemetery in Sunnyside, Staten Island. His son, James H. Van Pelt, was serving as an apprentice on a pilot boat outside Sandy Hook when his father was killed.

His nephew Frank P. Van Pelt, a Sandy Hook Pilot, died at age 81 in Staten Island on July 20, 1942.

See also

List of Northeastern U. S. Pilot Boats

References

 

Maritime pilotage
Sea captains
People from Staten Island
1878 deaths
1830 births